My Island Home (）is a song sung by Singaporean (Taiwan based) singer, Kaira Gong. The song is the official theme music to the 2006 national day parade. The song is one of the few NDP theme songs to not mention Singapore's name in it.

Music video
The promotional short film which is directed by Gloria Chee, shows Kaira riding in a largely obscured pickup truck from dawn till dusk as she rides around Singapore. Various scenes of Singaporean life plays throughout the video. The latter ends up at National Stadium where the song piece concludes. The film ends with Kaira smiling at the camera and later a bokeh of lights follows as the screen fades to black.

See also
 National Day Parade
 Music of Singapore

References

External links
 Official music video

2006 songs
2006 singles